Cary Farelli (born 19 June 1957) is an Italian ice hockey player. He competed in the men's tournament at the 1984 Winter Olympics.

References

External links
 

1957 births
Living people
Italian ice hockey players
Olympic ice hockey players of Italy
Ice hockey players at the 1984 Winter Olympics
Sportspeople from Pembroke, Ontario
Ice hockey people from Ontario
Toronto Marlboros players
Montreal Canadiens draft picks
Asiago Hockey 1935 players